In general terms, ona'ah ( or , lit. overreaching) refers to the Jewish laws surrounding monetary deception.

The word is used in modern Hebrew to describe fraud or embezzlement, while in halachic terms it describes unfair pricing.

References

Jewish law principles

Financial crimes
Hebrew words and phrases in Jewish law